The 2003 Bofrost Cup on Ice was held at the Emscher-Lippe-Halle in Gelsenkirchen from November 7 and 9. Medals were awarded in the disciplines of men's singles, ladies' singles, pair skating, and ice dancing. It was part of the ISU Grand Prix of Figure Skating series from its inception until 2003, when it was replaced by Cup of China. The 2003 competition was the first when it was not part of the Grand Prix. The 2003 competition debuted a new form of competition. Instead of a short program, singles and pairs perform a jumping and required elements contest, followed then by the free skating. Ice dancers perform their original and free dances.

Results

Men

Ladies

Pairs

Ice dancing

External links
 2003 Bofrost Cup on Ice

Bofrost Cup On Ice, 2003
Bofrost Cup on Ice